Atari Games Corporation, known as Midway Games West Inc. after 1999, was an American producer of arcade games. It was formed in 1985 when the coin-operated arcade game division of Atari, Inc. was transferred by Warner Communications to a joint venture with Namco. It was one of several successor companies to use the name Atari. The company developed and published games for arcades and across consumer gaming consoles such as the Commodore 16, Commodore 64, Game Boy, Nintendo Entertainment System (NES) and other platforms using the Tengen label. Some of the games Atari had developed include Tetris, Road Runner, RoadBlasters and Primal Rage. After Time Warner reassumed full ownership in 1994, the company was sold to WMS Industries in 1996, and became part of Midway Games when that company was spun-off by WMS in 1998. It ceased operations in 2003 and its former assets were sold back to Warner Bros. Interactive Entertainment (now Warner Bros. Games) in 2009 following Midway's bankruptcy.

History
When the Atari, Inc. division of Warner Communications lost $500 million in the first three quarters of 1983, its arcade coin-op division was the only one to make money. In 1984, Warner sold Atari's consumer products division to Jack Tramiel; he named this company Atari Corporation. Warner retained the coin-op division and a few other assets and changed the named of Atari, Inc. to Atari Games, Inc. The agreement between Tramiel and Warner Communications was that Atari Games must always include the "Games" after "Atari" on its logo and that Atari Games could not use the Atari brand at all in the consumer market (computers and home consoles). Atari Games retained most of the same employees and managers that had worked at the old Atari Inc. It was able to carry on with many of its projects from before the transition. Atari Corp., in contrast, froze projects and streamlined staff and operations. In 1985, Warner Communications and Namco jointly formed a new corporation, AT Games, Inc., and Warner transferred the coin-operated games division of Atari Games to the new corporate entity. Namco owned the controlling interest in the new company, while Warner retained 40%. Warner subsequently renamed Atari Games, Inc. to Atari Holdings, Inc., and AT Games became Atari Games Corporation. Namco later lost interest in operating Atari Games and sold 33% of its shares to a group of employees led by Hideyuki Nakajima, who had been the president of Atari Games since 1985. As the company was now split between three entities, Warner (40%), Namco (40%), and the employees (20%), and none of them held a controlling share, Atari Games effectively became an independent company. Atari Ireland was a subsidiary of Atari Games that manufactured their games for the European market; while under Namco, Atari Ireland also manufactured Sega's Hang-On (1985) for the European market.

Atari Games continued to manufacture arcade games and units, and starting in 1988, also sold cartridges for the Nintendo Entertainment System under the Tengen brand name, including a version of Tetris. The companies exchanged a number of lawsuits in the late 1980s related to disputes over the rights to Tetris and Tengen's circumvention of Nintendo's lockout chip, which prevented third parties from creating unauthorized games. (Atari Games' legal battles with Nintendo were separate from those of Atari Corporation, which also exchanged lawsuits with Nintendo in the late 1980s and early 1990s.) The suit finally reached a settlement in 1994, with Atari Games paying Nintendo cash damages and use of several patent licenses.

In 1989, Warner Communications merged with Time Inc., forming Time Warner. In 1993, Time Warner reacquired a controlling interest in Atari Games and made it a subsidiary of its Time Warner Interactive division. While the company initially maintained the Atari Games brand for arcade games under the new ownership, the Tengen brand was dropped in favor of the Time Warner Interactive label. In mid-1994, the Atari Games, Tengen, and Time Warner Interactive names were all consolidated under the Time Warner Interactive banner.

On July 12, 1994, Nakajima died at the age of 64.

In April 1996, after an unsuccessful bid by Atari co-founder Nolan Bushnell, the company was sold to WMS Industries, owners of the Williams, Bally and Midway arcade brands, which restored the use of the Atari Games name. According to Atari Games president Dan Van Elderen, in 1995, Time Warner decided to exit the video game business and instructed the management at Atari Games to find a buyer for themselves, which surprised him because usually parent companies choose the buyers for their subsidiaries. Time Warner would not return to the video game business until the formation of Warner Bros. Interactive Entertainment on January 14, 2004.

On April 6, 1998, the video game assets of WMS Industries were spun off as a new independent company called Midway Games, which then gained control of the Atari Games division. Meanwhile, Hasbro Interactive acquired the Atari brand for the home market from JTS Corporation that same year. With the changes in ownership of the two companies, on November 19, 1999, Atari Games Corporation was renamed Midway Games West Inc., resulting in the Atari Games name no longer being used.

In 2001, Midway Games exited the arcade industry, due to a decline in the market. Despite this, Midway Games West continued to produce games for the home market until it was disbanded on February 7, 2003, after a slump in game sales. Although no longer in operation, Midway Games West continued to exist as a holding entity for the copyrights and trademarks of the games originally from Atari Games. In February 2009, Midway Games filed for Chapter 11 bankruptcy protection and in July 2009, most of Midway's assets were sold to Warner Bros. Interactive Entertainment, ultimately bringing all of the Atari Games properties back to Time Warner again.

Games

Developed

Published

Cancelled

Notes

References

External links
 (from the Internet Archives Wayback Machine)

Atari

Video game development companies
Video game publishers
Software companies based in the San Francisco Bay Area
Companies based in Milpitas, California
Video game companies established in 1984
Video game companies disestablished in 2003
Defunct video game companies of the United States
Video game companies based in California
1984 establishments in California
2003 disestablishments in California
Defunct companies based in the San Francisco Bay Area